James Richard "Jim" Jackson (May 16, 1924 – March 20, 2011) was an American mathematician, well known for his contribution to queueing theory.

Jackson was born in Denver and raised in Beverly Hills. He served in the United States Air Force during World War II. After his service, he earned an A.B. in 1946, an M.A. in 1950 and a Ph.D. in 1952, with a thesis titled Abstract Function Spaces and Their Homotopy Theory. All of these degrees were from UCLA where Jackson remained in the School of Management for his career until his retirement in 1985.

While at University of California, Los Angeles  he developed the Jackson's theorem and some of the first models that could predict the performance of networks with several nodes. Jackson's work was inspired by his experience in the Los Angeles aircraft industry, but the results found applications in the design of computers, manufacturing and the then emerging packet switched networks, such as those undertaken by Leonard Kleinrock in 1961.

He spent his retirement in Tehachapi, California.

Publications

References

20th-century American mathematicians
Queueing theorists
UCLA Anderson School of Management faculty
1924 births
2011 deaths
United States Army Air Forces personnel of World War II